The American rock group Counting Crows has released seven studio albums, one extended play, two compilation albums and five live albums. Five of the band's singles ("Mr. Jones", "A Long December", "Hanginaround", "Round Here", and "Accidentally in Love") charted within the Top 40 of the United States Radio Songs Chart, and "Mr. Jones" and "A Long December" reached the Top 10.

Counting Crows's debut album, August and Everything After, was released in September 1993. The album charted within the Top Five of the Billboard 200. August and Everything After was certified seven-times platinum in Canada by the Canadian Recording Industry Association and seven-times platinum in the United States by the Recording Industry Association of America. The band's second album, Recovering the Satellites, peaked at number one on the Billboard 200.

Six of the band's albums have charted on the Billboard 200 and four have been certified gold or platinum by the Recording Industry Association of America. Other certified gold releases include the 2003 single "Big Yellow Taxi" and the 2004 single "Accidentally in Love". The latter was released on the Shrek 2 soundtrack.

Albums

Studio albums

Compilation albums

Live albums

Extended plays

Singles

1990s

2000s

2010s and 2020s

Other contributions

Album

Non-album

References

Discography
Rock music group discographies
Discographies of American artists
Alternative rock discographies